is a Japanese adult video production company with headquarters in the Shinjuku Building, Shinjuku, Tokyo.

Company information
Waap Entertainment was founded in 1998 and released its first videos in December of that year. The company specializes in single actress videos and is best known for its  series which premiered on December 17, 1998 with Dream Shower No.1 starring Izumi Maki and directed by Alala Kurosawa. The series is part bukkake and part gangbang and has appeared in more than sixty installments on the company's Beauty label. The studio is also recognized for having developed several prominent modern AV directors including Alala Kurosawa, [Jo]Style, K*WEST and KINGDOM.

When S1 No. 1 Style introduced the new less concealing digital mosaic style of censorship in late 2004, Waap followed soon afterward with their own  videos. Waap Entertainment produces about 10 new videos per month and the Hokuto Corporation's AV retailer DMM listed more than 1500 DVD titles available under the Waap Entertainment name as of September 2011.

The company's reputation has extended to the Village Voice where columnist Johnny Maldoro named Waap's video Semen Club 2 starring Yui Kayama as the Bukkake Best of 2003. Waap has also expanded into another area of entertainment with game, puzzle and photo collection apps for the iPhone featuring some of the studio's top models.

Labels
Waap has used a number of different labels for its videos since 1998:

 Beauty
 Boin Club
 Cobra
 Dragons Gate
 Encore
 Fearless
 Foxy
 Gone
 Jelly
 Kohshiro
 Milk
 Select
 Shoot
 So
 Star Box
 un/limited
 Washing Machine

Directors
Prominent directors at Waap Entertainment include:

 [Jo]Style
 Goemon 
 KINGDOM
 Koushirou 
 Alala Kurosawa
 K*WEST

Actresses
Popular AV Idols who have appeared in Waap Entertainment videos include:

 Bunko Kanazawa
 Kirari Koizumi
 Marin
 Aika Miura
 Momoka Nishina
 Nao Oikawa
 Maria Ozawa
 Asuka Sakamaki
 Riko Tachibana
 Tsubomi
 Akira Watase
 Maria Yumeno

Series
Some popular Waap series:
 Dream Shower
 Slut Actress
 Your Masturbation Will Help You

AV Open / AV Grand Prix
For the 2006 AV Open competition, Waap entered both the Main Stage and the Challenge stage. Their Main Stage entry was Only One - Miracle Woman, video OPEN-0616, featuring several amateur actresses. In the Challenge Stage, the company nominated Divide My Pleasure directed by Kirin, starring Ren Hitomi and Yuri Ueno, and labelled OPEN-0652.

Waap Entertainment was also one of the 19 companies which submitted entries for the 2007 AV Open contest. Their entry Deep Lesbian & Hot Semen & Black Fuck, labelled OPEN-0717, was an interracial video starring Marin and Shiho, and directed by K*WEST. which finished in 8th place overall and won a Lily Franky Honorary President Prize.

The company was also one of the participants in the Hokuto Corporation sponsored 2008 AV Grand Prix with their entry Shall We Fuck x10, AVGP-042, starring Lemon Tachibana and directed by K*WEST and Goemon. In the 2009 AV Grand Prix, Waap took one of the Special Awards Fetish Video for Tsubomi - Semen Club, AVGP-148, with Tsubomi, directed by Takuan.

Notes

Sources
 
 

Japanese pornographic film studios
Mass media companies established in 1998
Japanese companies established in 1998
Film production companies of Japan
Bukkake
Mass media companies based in Tokyo
Shinjuku